Lovely Difficult is the fourth album by Mayra Andrade, released on November 11, 2013 in Cape Verde, Brazil, and much of western Europe. Compared to her first three albums, Lovely Difficult is less traditional and more pop, with collaborations with artists from the United States, Israel, France, and England and songs in Portuguese, Cape Verdean creole, French, and English. The first single, "We Used to Call It Love", was released in September 2013.

Reception 

The album was nominated in the Best World Music Album category at the 2014 Victoires de la Musique.

Track listing

References

External links 

 

Mayra Andrade albums
2013 albums